The 2012 European Qualification Tournament for London Olympic Games was held in Kazan, Russia from January 27 to January 29, 2012. Each country may enter maximum 2 male and 2 female divisions with only one in each division and the first three ranked athletes per weight division qualify their NOCs a place each for Olympic Games.

Medalists

Men

Women

Qualification summary

Results

Men

−58 kg
27 January

−68 kg
28 January

−80 kg
29 January

+80 kg
28 January

Women

−49 kg
27 January

−57 kg
28 January

−67 kg
29 January

+67 kg
29 January

References

 Results January 27, 2012
 Results January 28, 2012

External links
 World Taekwondo Federation

Olympic Qualification
Taekwondo Olympic Qual
Taekwondo Olympic Qual
Europe